Kekere Moukailou (born 8 August 1992) is an Ivorian professional footballer who plays as a defender for Myanmar club Hanthawaddy United. He has played in Thailand.

Club career

Under contract with Myanmar's Yadanarbon from 2015 to 2016, Moukailou was teammates with Myanmar national team members Zaw Linn Tun, Sithu Aung, Ye Ko Oo, and Aung Thu.  On playing football in Myanmar, the Ivorian defender stated that the climate was harmful to health and it could potentially cause heart disease.

Was mistaken for fellow Ivorian Djawa Maximin in a 2015 league match and was given a second yellow card when Maximin was given the first.

His contract with Yangon United was renewed for another year just before the 2018 Myanmar National League.

References

1992 births
Living people
Ivorian footballers
Yangon United F.C. players
Association football midfielders
Expatriate footballers in Myanmar
Myanmar National League players
Expatriate footballers in Thailand
Ivorian expatriate footballers